Carenage is a town in the Republic of Trinidad and Tobago.  It is located in northwestern Trinidad, and is administered by the Diego Martin Regional Corporation. Located close to Chaguaramas, it is more of a residential area than a commercial or industrial locale.

The name is derived from the practice of careening (i.e., beaching, "carénage" in French) sailing vessels for maintenance, which had been done in the area for many years.

References

External links
 Local Government Corporations, from Nalis, the National Library and Information Service of Trinidad and Tobago.

Populated places in Trinidad and Tobago